Mohamed Bangura (born January 1, 1959) is a former Olympic boxer from Sierra Leone. He represented his native country in the 1980 Summer Olympics, which were held in the Soviet Union capital of Moscow. He fought in the men's lightweight division and was defeated by eventual silver medal winner Viktor Demyanenko of the Soviet Union after disqualification in the second round.

1980 Olympic results
Below is the record of Mohamed Bangura, a lightweight boxer from Sierra Leone who competed at the 1980 Moscow Olympics:

 Round of 32: lost to Viktor Demyanenko (Soviet Union) by disqualification in the second round

See also
Boxing at the 1980 Summer Olympics

References
sports-reference

1959 births
Living people
Sierra Leonean male boxers
Olympic boxers of Sierra Leone
Boxers at the 1980 Summer Olympics
Lightweight boxers